Halifax Area High School is a suburban, public secondary school located at 3940 Peters Mountain Road, Halifax, Halifax Township, Dauphin County, Pennsylvania. It was built in 1958. It is the sole high school operated by the Halifax Area School District. As of the 2017–2018 school year, enrollment was 295 pupils in 9th through 12th grades.

Extracurriculars
Halifax Area High School offers a wide variety of clubs, activities and an extensive sports program.

Sports
The District funds:

Boys
Baseball - A
Basketball- A
Football - A
Soccer - A
Wrestling - AA

Girls
Basketball - AA
Cheer - AAAA
Soccer (Fall) - A
Softball - A
Volleyball - A

According to PIAA directory July 2014

References

External links
Halifax Area High School website

Public high schools in Pennsylvania
Schools in Dauphin County, Pennsylvania
Susquehanna Valley
Educational institutions established in 1958
1958 establishments in Pennsylvania